Hasanabad (also Romanized as Ḩasanābād) is a village in Sofla Rural District, in the Central District of Kharameh County, Fars Province, Iran. At the 2006 census, its population was 151, in 42 families.

References 

Populated places in Kharameh County